Howz-e Karam (also Romanized as Ḩowẕ-e Karam) is a village in Jangal Rural District, Jangal District, Roshtkhar County, Razavi Khorasan Province, Iran. At the 2006 census, its population was 198, in 43 families.

References 

Populated places in Roshtkhar County